Neossos is a genus of flies in the family Heleomyzidae.

Species
Neossos atlanticus Gilbert & Wheeler, 2007
Neossos californicus Melander, 1952
Neossos marylandicus Malloch, 1927
Neossos nidicola (Frey, 1930)
Neossos wegelii (Frey, 1952)

References

Heleomyzidae
Diptera of Europe
Taxa named by John Russell Malloch